The 1974 Amateur World Series was the second baseball Amateur World Series staged by the short-lived Federación Mundial de Béisbol Amateur (FEMBA) but was kept on the books after FEMBA once again joined with the FIBA. The Series was held in St. Petersburg, FL, Clearwater, FL and Bradenton, FL from November 13 through November 24, 1974. Very few records for the event have been located.

Final standings

References

Baseball World Cup, 1974
Baseball World Cup
1974
Amateur World Series
Baseball competitions in Florida
International sports competitions in Florida